The 1924 United States Senate election in Montana took place on November 4, 1924. Incumbent United States Senator Thomas J. Walsh, who was first elected to the Senate in 1912 by the state legislature (as was the practice then), and re-elected in 1918 by popular vote (in accordance with the 17th Amendment), ran for re-election. He was unopposed in the Democratic primary. 

He faced former State Representative Frank Bird Linderman and several independent opponents in the general election. Walsh ultimately won re-election to his third term by a solid margin.

Democratic primary

Candidates
Thomas J. Walsh, incumbent United States Senator

Results

Farmer-Labor primary

Candidates
J. W. Anderson

Results

Republican primary

Candidates
Frank Bird Linderman, former State Representative, former Assistant Secretary of State of Montana
Wellington D. Rankin, Attorney General of Montana
John W. Allison
R. W. Kemp

Results

General election

Results

References

Montana
1924
United States Senate